The Wessex Regionalists are a minor English regionalist political party in the United Kingdom. It seeks a degree of legislative and administrative home rule for Wessex, an area in the south and south-west of England loosely based on the Anglo-Saxon kingdom of the same name.
  
The party has contested a small number of Wessex-area parliamentary constituencies in most elections since it was established, but without success.

History
Speaking at a tourism industry conference in 1969, the then Viscount Weymouth suggested Wessex as a regional identity for tourism purposes. He later objected to the press over Wessex not being given the same opportunities as Scotland or Wales in the Kilbrandon Report. Lord Weymouth subsequently stood as the first Wessex Regionalist parliamentary candidate in Westbury in the February 1974 United Kingdom general election, coming last with 521 votes.

The party was formally constituted in 1981. It initially used Thomas Hardy's definition of Wessex as Berkshire, Hampshire, Wiltshire, Somerset, Dorset and Devon; but later added Oxfordshire and Gloucestershire.  It pulled out of the 1987 general election and advocated that its supporters voted for the Liberal/SDP Alliance on the basis that they were a close second in many Wessex seats and were the most supportive of regional government.

Lord Weymouth (who succeeded as The 7th Marquess of Bath in June 1992) was the first president of the party, later defecting to the Liberal Democrats although in 1999 he was "still in touch" with the Wessex Regionalists.  Subsequent presidents have included the activist John Banks and the former architect Colin Bex.

In 2013, Dorset County Councillor David C Fox switched his party allegiance from Liberal Democrat to Wessex Regionalist for his final few days in office.

During the 2015 general election, Bex cast doubt on the official version of events of the 2001 September 11 attacks. During the UK's 2016 referendum on membership of the European Union, the then-president Bex campaigned to leave. He described immigration as a "peaceful invasion", describing "people from all over the world" as "infiltrating" national institutions. Devizes candidate and party leader Jim Gunter, at a hustings shortly before the 2017 general election, advocated a second referendum and, if that were not possible, the "Norway option" of remaining in the single market.

Ideology

The party has been described as ethnoterritorial, though an earlier study of regionalist and nationalist parties in Britain reached the opposite conclusion, saying that "For regionalism, the legitimacy of the state as a whole is not usually in question; the challenge is to its territorial organisation.  This is in contrast to ethnic nationalism (for example, that advocated for Wales), which suggests that the state is not legitimate because it contains different nations." Its platform is based on the creation of a devolved assembly for the region it defines as Wessex. The party defines the counties of Berkshire, Devon, Dorset, Gloucestershire, Hampshire, the Isle of Wight, Oxfordshire, Somerset, and Wiltshire as being part of Wessex. Whilst this roughly corresponds to the South West Region, it also includes the Western counties of the South East Region, and excludes Cornwall, which it describes as being "the last of the Celtic areas to be incorporated into Wessex", and retaining its own identity, as well as own regionalist party, Mebyon Kernow. The assembly has variously been described as having a rotating location in the style of the Anglo-Saxon Witenagemot and as being based in Winchester, which had been the capital of the ancient kingdom of Wessex. The assembly would take power from Parliament in Westminster rather than from local authorities.

In light of European recognition of the Cornish people as a national minority, the party called for greater protection of local produce and what it described as the "Wessex dialect". The party believes that the Wessex region has a distinct cultural identity, which it seeks to promote. It defines this culture as including morris dancing, cider, and the works of various local writers. The party was described in The Guardian as having a "nostalgia for pre-industrial revolution England".

In 2010, the party advocated a 100% tax rate on the top 10% of earners, with the revenue passed to parish councils.

Electoral performance

Westminster elections

European Parliament elections

References

Sources

External links
 
 Wessex Regionalists Party papers 1975–1996 University of Bristol Library Special Collections

Political parties established in 1974
Locally based political parties in England
Home rule in the United Kingdom
Regionalist parties in the United Kingdom
1974 establishments in the United Kingdom
Wessex
Regionalism (politics) in the United Kingdom